Darius Hadley (born September 9, 1973) is a retired American football Defensive specialist/Wide receiver. He played college football at South Carolina State University.

In his six-year career, Hadley played for the Memphis Pharaohs, Florida Bobcats, Grand Rapids Rampage, and Los Angeles Avengers of the Arena Football League.

External links
 Stats at ArenaFan

1973 births
Living people
Players of American football from Miami
American football defensive linemen
South Carolina State Bulldogs football players
Memphis Pharaohs players
Florida Bobcats players
Grand Rapids Rampage players
Los Angeles Avengers players